Barbara Jacobs Rothstein (born 1939) is a senior United States district judge of the United States District Court for the Western District of Washington.

Life and career 

Born in Brooklyn, New York, Rothstein received a Bachelor of Arts degree from Cornell University in 1960 and a Bachelor of Laws from Harvard Law School in 1966. She was in private practice in Boston, Massachusetts from 1966 to 1968. She worked for the Washington State Attorney General's Office from 1968 to 1977, where she worked as assistant attorney general and chief trial attorney for the Consumer Protection and Antitrust Division. She was also an adjunct professor at the University of Washington Law School from 1975 to 1977. She was a judge of the Superior Court of Washington in King County, Washington from 1977 to 1980.

Federal judicial service 

On December 3, 1979, Rothstein was nominated by President Jimmy Carter to a new seat on the United States District Court for the Western District of Washington created by 92 Stat. 1629; She was confirmed by the United States Senate on February 20, 1980, and received her commission the same day. She served as Chief Judge from 1987 to 1994. From 2003 to 2011, she was the Director of the Federal Judicial Center. She assumed senior status on September 1, 2011, and is currently serving by designation on the United States District Court for the District of Columbia.

Notable case

In February 2020, Rothstein, sitting by designation with the 11th Circuit in Florida, was a member of a 3-judge panel in Jones et al. v. DeSantis, a 2020 voting rights case. 2018 Florida Amendment 4 permitted former felons to vote, however DeSantis signed a law that required former felons to pay all legal fees before being eligible to vote again, despite some of them not knowing how much they owed. District judge Robert Hinkle struck down that law, and the panel kept the injunction against the law. However, the panel was reversed in a sharply divided en banc decision that September.

See also
List of Jewish American jurists

References

1939 births
Living people
People from Brooklyn
Cornell University alumni
Harvard Law School alumni
Washington (state) state court judges
Judges of the United States District Court for the Western District of Washington
Superior court judges in the United States
United States district court judges appointed by Jimmy Carter
20th-century American judges
University of Washington School of Law faculty
American women legal scholars
American legal scholars
21st-century American judges
20th-century American women judges
21st-century American women judges